Charles Anthony Peyton (March 3, 1921 – July 23, 2007) was an American professional basketball player. He played for the Chicago Studebaker Flyers in the National Basketball League during the 1942–43 season and averaged 2.4 points per game. He also played for barnstorming teams such as the Harlem Globetrotters and New York Renaissance.

References

External links
 Obituary

1921 births
2007 deaths
American men's basketball players
Basketball players from Ohio
Chicago Studebaker Flyers players
Forwards (basketball)
Guards (basketball)
Harlem Globetrotters players
Michigan Wolverines men's basketball players
New York Renaissance players
People from Elyria, Ohio
Sportspeople from Toledo, Ohio
20th-century African-American sportspeople
21st-century African-American people